Drenovo is a village (село) in southwestern Bulgaria, located in the Kostinbrod Municipality of the Sofia Province.

References

Villages in Sofia Province